Boys World is an American girl group that was formed in Los Angeles in April 2019. The group was formed by KYN Entertainment after the company directors contacted each of the members on social media, having seen their singing videos online. The group was kept a secret until January 2020, when they began posting on social media. They released their debut single "Girlfriends" in October 2020, which was followed by an extended play, While You Were Out, in April 2021.

History

2019–2021: While You Were Out and Singles 
In 2019, the members of Boys World were scouted by KYN Entertainment after the company directors had seen their singing videos online. Each member was sent a direct message on Instagram about the opportunity to be in a girl group. Villaluz, the first member to be contacted, took over a month to respond to the message as she had doubts over the genuineness of the message. Kay added that it was also "hard to believe" and that they had a lot of conversations with KYN, but once it had come into motion, it felt right for her. Sonny Takhar, the founder of KYN, stated that as the group was formed, the existing members were in charge of who else was added to the lineup. After Villaluz followed Simpson, Kay, Caceres and Ruby; the group was formed on April 26, 2019. Boys World was revealed to the public when they posted on their TikTok account in January 2020, after the group got a house in Los Angeles together. The term Boys in their name stands for Best of Your Self. On October 22, 2020, they released their debut single, "Girlfriends". The group stated that the "empowering girl anthem" is about their friendship with each other and that the recording of the song spanned across a year in order to perfect it.

They followed their first single with "Wingman" released on January 29, 2021. Clash magazine described the song as "an uplifting blast of energy", with Paper magazine writing that the song is "a verifiable girl power anthem". "Wingman" is the first song that Boys World recorded, so they felt it had "a special place in [their] heart". In February 2021, they performed the national anthem at the 2021 Puppy Bowl. In March 2021, the group released their third single, "Tiptoe". Clash noted that the song shows their potential and versatility as a group. On April 9, 2021, they released their debut extended play, While You Were Out.

On May 21, 2021, they released the single "All Me", which was followed up by "Something in the Water".

2022–present 
In July 2022, they released the single, "So What". On January 18, 2023, they released the single, "Mantrum".

Discography

Extended plays

Singles

Music videos

References

External links
 

2019 establishments in California
American girl groups
American pop girl groups
American vocal groups
Musical groups established in 2019
Musical groups from Los Angeles
Teen pop groups
Vocal quintets